The 2023 FIFA Women's World Cup qualification process determined 30 of the 32 teams which will play in the 2023 FIFA Women's World Cup, with the co-hosts Australia and New Zealand qualifying automatically. It is the ninth FIFA Women's World Cup, the quadrennial international women's football world championship tournament. The tournament is the first Women's World Cup to be hosted in multiple countries, the third by an AFC member association after the 1991 and 2007 Women's World Cups in China, the first to be held in the Southern Hemisphere, the first senior FIFA tournament in Oceania, and also the first FIFA tournament to be hosted across multiple confederations (with Australia in the AFC and New Zealand in the OFC).

The field was expanded from 24 teams in the 2019 edition to 32 in the 2023 edition.

Qualified teams
Of the total 32 slots (29 direct and 3 playoffs), the following teams qualified directly to fill the 29 direct slots.  The remaining 3 playoff slots were determined by the 2023 FIFA Women's World Cup qualification (inter-confederation play-offs) held in February 2023 in New Zealand.

Qualification process
After the number of teams qualifying for the Women's World Cup was increased, a new slot allocation was approved by the Bureau of the FIFA Council on 24 December 2020. The slots for the host nations, Australia and New Zealand, were taken directly from the quotas allocated to their confederations, the AFC and OFC respectively.

Summary of qualification
Qualifying matches started in September 2021 and ended in February 2023. Matches have been played on dates within the FIFA International Match Calendar.

Apart from the hosts Australia and New Zealand, 207 of 209 remaining FIFA member associations could qualify through their own confederation's qualifying process if they choose to enter. The exceptions were Chad and Pakistan, whose football associations were suspended by FIFA. A third exception might have been Russia after initially receiving a four-year ban from all major sporting events by the World Anti-Doping Agency (WADA) on 9 December 2019, after Russian Anti-Doping Agency (RUSADA) was found non-compliant for handing over manipulated laboratory data to investigators. However, the Russian women's team could still enter qualification. The decision was appealed to the Court of Arbitration for Sport (CAS), which ruled in WADA's favour but reduced the ban to two years. The CAS ruling also allowed the name "Russia" to be displayed on uniforms if the words "Neutral Athlete" or "Neutral Team" have equal prominence. Had Russia qualified for the tournament, its female players would have been able to use their country's name, flag or anthem at the Women's World Cup, unlike their male counterparts, as the ban scheduled to expire on 16 December 2022. But earlier on 28 February, FIFA and UEFA announced Russia's suspension from all competitions following the 2022 Russian invasion of Ukraine. On 2 May, UEFA announced that Russia was no longer to continue participating in qualification, that their prior results were nullified, and that Group E continued with five teams.

Confederation qualification

AFC

As in the previous World Cup cycle, the AFC Women's Asian Cup served as the World Cup qualifying tournament for AFC members. The World Cup qualifying process was as follows:
Qualifying stage: The 2022 AFC Women's Asian Cup qualification competition was held between 17 and 29 September and between 18 and 24 October 2021. Teams competed for qualification for the final tournament, where they were joined by final tournament hosts India and the top three teams of the 2018 AFC Women's Asian Cup, Japan, Australia, and China, who qualified automatically.
Final tournament: Twelve teams played in the 2022 AFC Women's Asian Cup, which was held from 20 January to 6 February 2022. They were drawn into three groups of four teams. The top two teams of each group, along with the two-best third-placed teams, advanced to the knockout stage. The four semi-finalists qualified for the World Cup. The losers of the quarter-finals (except Australia, who qualified automatically for the World Cup as hosts) advanced to the play-offs.

North Korea withdrew on 29 July 2021 from the Women's Asian Cup qualifiers due to COVID-19 pandemic-related safety concerns, followed by Turkmenistan on 6 August because of pandemic-related travel restrictions. In a letter to the AFC published on 8 September, Iraq decided not to take part. Afghanistan also withdrew from qualification later in September as the women's team's participation was uncertain due to the Taliban takeover of the country.

During the Women's Asian Cup, host team India was unable to play their match of the group stage against Chinese Taipei due to having fewer than 13 players available, with the remaining team members testing positive for COVID-19. They were considered to have withdrawn from the competition, and all previous matches played by them were considered "null and void" and were not considered in determining the final group rankings.

Knockout stage

Play-offs
The format of the play-off round depended on the performance of Australia, who qualified automatically for the World Cup as hosts. Since Australia was eliminated in the quarter-finals, the play-offs format was for the remaining three quarter-final losers to play a single round-robin play-off. The best team after three matches advanced to the World Cup, and the remaining two teams entered the inter-confederation play-offs.

CAF

As in the previous World Cup cycle, the Women's Africa Cup of Nations served as the World Cup qualifying tournament for CAF members. The World Cup qualifying process was as follows:
Qualifying stage: 2022 Women's Africa Cup of Nations qualification competition was held between 18 and 26 October 2021 and between 14 and 23 February 2022. Teams competed for qualification for the final tournament, where they were joined by final tournament hosts Morocco.  
Final tournament: Twelve teams played in the 2022 Women's Africa Cup of Nations which was held from 2–23 July 2022. They were drawn into three groups of four teams. The top two teams of each group, along with the two-best third-placed teams, advanced to the knockout stage. The four semi-finalists qualified for the World Cup. The losers of the quarter-finals played a one-match repechage, with the winners advancing to the inter-confederation play-offs.

Knockout stage

CONCACAF

As in the previous World Cup cycle, the CONCACAF W Championship served as the World Cup qualifying tournament for CONCACAF members. The World Cup qualifying process was as follows:
Qualifying stage: The 2022 CONCACAF W Championship qualification competition was held in February 2022. Teams were drawn into six groups of five, and played single round-robin matches (two home and two away). The six group winners advanced to the final tournament to join the two highest-ranked CONCACAF teams, Canada and the United States, who qualified automatically.
Final tournament: Eight teams played in the 2022 CONCACAF W Championship. They were drawn into two groups of four teams and played single round-robin matches. The top two teams of each group advanced to the knockout stage and qualified for the World Cup. The third-placed team in each group advanced to the inter-confederation play-offs.

Group stage

Knockout stage

CONMEBOL

The Copa América Femenina was held from 8–30 July 2022, providing three direct qualifying places and two play-off places for the Women's World Cup.

Knockout stage

OFC

The OFC Women's Nations Cup was held from 13 to 30 July, with Fiji hosting the tournament. It was originally scheduled for July and August 2022, but was shifted to January and February 2022 to accommodate changes to the FIFA Women's International Match Calendar. It was subsequently pushed back to July due to the COVID-19 pandemic.

New Zealand did not take part as they had already qualified for the World Cup as co-hosts, and American Samoa opted not to participate due to continuing difficulties related to the pandemic. The remaining nine teams were ranked according to the 25 March world rankings and drawn into three groups on 10 May, from which the top two teams in each group and the top two third place teams advanced to the knockout stage. Papua New Guinea advanced to the inter-confederation play-offs as tournament winners.

Knockout stage

UEFA

The World Cup qualifying process is as follows:
Group stage: 51 teams were drawn into nine groups of five or six teams, where each group is played in a home-and-away round-robin format. The nine group winners qualify directly for the World Cup, while the nine runners-up advance to the play-offs.
Play-offs: The nine teams played two knockout rounds of single-leg matches, with the best three runners-up entering in the second round. Among the three second round play-off winners, the two teams with the best combined records in the group stage (8 matches, excluding the ones against sixth-placed teams for those from groups with six teams) and second round play-offs (1 match) qualified for the World Cup, while the team with the lowest combined record (group stage plus second play-off round) entered the inter-confederation play-offs.

Group stage

Play-offs

Ranking of play-off winners

Inter-confederation play-offs

The final three spots at the FIFA Women's World Cup were decided through a ten-team play-off tournament. The tournament was used as a test event for New Zealand to host prior to the Women's World Cup.

In the play-off draw, four teams were seeded into groups based on the FIFA Women's World Rankings, with a maximum of one seeded team per confederation. Teams from the same confederation were not drawn into the same group. The winner of each group qualified for the FIFA Women's World Cup.

Group A

Group B

Group C

Top goalscorers

References

 
Qualification
2023
Fifa Women's World Cup
Fifa Women's World Cup
Fifa Women's World Cup